George Dunsford Barne  (6 May 1879 – 18 June 1954) was a Jamaican-born British Anglican priest who was Bishop of Lahore between 1932 and 1949. He was also a cricketer who played for Somerset County Cricket Club.

Educated at Clifton College and Oriel College, Oxford, Barne picked up a single first-class appearance for Somerset against Oxford University in 1904. Somerset lost the match by an innings margin, with Barne picking up one run in the first innings and nine in the second as a tailend batsman. Barne's brothers-in-law, Alexander Streatfeild-Moore and Edward Streatfeild, played first-class cricket in the late 19th century, the former playing county cricket for Kent, the latter for Surrey. In 1933, Barne officiated in a first-class match between Patiala and a touring Marylebone Cricket Club team.

After a short period as a schoolmaster, he was ordained in 1904 and after a curacy at St John the Baptist Summertown, Oxford he became a Missionary in India, eventually rising to be Principal of the Lawrence Royal Military School, Sanawar before appointment to the episcopate. A common room at the Edwardes College Peshawar is named Barnes Room, which he inaugurated in 1938. He was appointed an Officer of the Order of the British Empire in the 1919 New Year Honours. He became a Companion of the Order of the Indian Empire in 1923.

His last post was as Vicar of Harthill, South Yorkshire, although he died in Hammersmith.

References

1879 births
1954 deaths
English cricketers
Somerset cricketers
Jamaican Anglicans
People educated at Clifton College
Alumni of Oriel College, Oxford
20th-century Anglican bishops in Asia
British Anglican missionaries
Anglican missionaries in India
Anglican missionaries in Pakistan
Anglican bishops of Lahore
Officers of the Order of the British Empire
Jamaican cricketers
English cricket umpires
Jamaican cricket umpires
Companions of the Order of the Indian Empire
Officers' Training Corps officers
Indian Defence Force officers